Fissuravis ("fissure bird") is a genus of extinct bird from the Paleocene of Germany. A lithornithid, it was closely related to modern ratites, but it was a capable flyer.

Ecology
Hailing from the Walbeck Paleocene deposits, it is found amidst a rich avian fauna, which also included the gigantic Gastornis and the enigmatic ratite Remiornis.
	
Like most lithornithids, it was probably a very competent flyer, its coracoid remnants suggesting powerful flight musculature, and it likely engaged in a similar style of soaring flight to Lithornis and Pseudocrypturus.

References

Prehistoric bird genera
Lithornithidae
Paleogene birds of Europe
Paleocene birds
Cenozoic birds of Europe
Fauna of Germany